It's Only Natural is the thirty-first studio album released by the country music vocal group The Oak Ridge Boys. It was released September 19, 2011 by the music publishing division of the Cracker Barrel Old Country Store restaurant chain. The album contains five new songs and newly re-recorded versions of six older Oak Ridge Boys songs. Also included is a re-recording of "Louisiana Red Dirt Highway", which William Lee Golden originally released in 1990 during his hiatus from the group.

Critical reception
Giving it three stars out of five, Billy Dukes of Taste of Country thought that some of the songs were "sleepy" but praised "What'cha Gonna Do?" and "The Shade". A four-star review came from Bobby Peacock of Roughstock, who thought that its new songs were mostly well-suited to the group, and praised the re-recordings for their arrangements.

Track listing

Songs marked with a † indicate new songs recorded for this album.

Chart performance

References

2011 albums
The Oak Ridge Boys albums
Cracker Barrel albums
Albums produced by Ron Chancey